Fernando Alberto dos Santos Cardinal (born 26 June 1985), is a Portuguese professional futsal player who plays for Sporting CP and the Portugal national team.

Honours
UEFA Futsal Champions League: 2018–19

External links

1986 births
Living people
Portuguese men's futsal players
Inter FS players
Sporting CP futsal players
Sportspeople from Porto